Darwin and the Science of Evolution (UK title: Charles Darwin: The Scholar Who Changed Human History) is a 2000 illustrated biography of Charles Darwin, and a monograph on his theory of evolution. Written by the French historian of science , and published in pocket format by Éditions Gallimard as the  volume in their "Découvertes" collection (known as "Abrams Discoveries" in the United States, and "New Horizons" in the United Kingdom). The book was adapted into a documentary film of the same title in 2002.

Introduction 

The book is part of the  series (formerly belonging to  series) in the "Découvertes Gallimard" collection. According to the tradition of "Découvertes", which is based on an abundant pictorial documentation and a way of bringing together visual documents and texts, enhanced by printing on coated paper, as commented in L'Express, "genuine monographs, published like art books". It's almost like a "graphic novel", replete with colour plates.

Here the author sheds light on the life and work of the main founder of the science of evolution. Part biography, part history of science and social documentary, this book takes readers on Darwin's journey of discovery.

Reception 
On Babelio, the book gets an average of 3.50/5 based on 6 ratings. Goodreads reported, based on 21 ratings, an average of 3.48 out of 5, indicating "generally positive opinions".

Adaptation 
In 2002, the book was adapted as an documentary film of the same name. A co-production between La Sept-Arte and Trans Europe Film, with the collaboration of Éditions Gallimard and CNRS Images Média, the film was directed by Valérie Winckler, with voice-over narration by the French actor  and the director. It was broadcast on Arte as part of the television programme The Human Adventure, and dubbed into German under the title . However, it is unclear whether the film is available in English.

See also 
 On the Origin of Species

References

External links 
  
 
 
 

2000 non-fiction books
Books about Charles Darwin
French biographies
Biographies adapted into films
Découvertes Gallimard
2002 documentary films
French documentary television films
Documentary films about men
Documentary films about the history of science
Films based on biographies
2000s French films